Watchtower is a hamlet (and census-designated place) located in the Town of Shawangunk, Ulster County, New York, United States. The population was 1,709 at the 2020 census.

It is owned and operated by the Watchtower Society (a legal entity of Jehovah's Witnesses) and has been in operation since 1963.

Demographics

References

Census-designated places in New York (state)
Census-designated places in Ulster County, New York
Hamlets in New York (state)
Hamlets in Ulster County, New York